Inside Sport is an Australian sport magazine published by nextmedia. It began publication in 1991.  Inside Sport largely comprises articles by freelance journalists, covering a wide array of sports. It focuses on sporting content, sports photography, and the attention given to models and their photo shoots.

In 2000, the publication won the award for Magazine of the Year in Australia. It also won the Walkley Award for sports coverage across all media in 2004.

Nikki Visser has appeared on the cover of Inside Sport four times; July 1996, July 1998, April 1999 and March 2002. The magazine also organised an annual national model contest -The Inside Sport Model Search- which ran from 1996 until 2008. Notable contestants included Nikki Visser, Nicky Whelan, Imogen Bailey, Grace McClure and Jennifer Hawkins.

In May 2007, the magazine's editors made the decision to cease using a scantically-clad 'sports model' to illustrate the cover and centre-pages of each issue (many of the women featured were professional models or entertainment celebrities rather than actual athletes).  Instead, a notable sportsperson, male or female, would adorn the cover each month. This decision was made to improve sales which in mid-2007 had fallen to 23,000 per month down from a monthly peak circulation of 80,000 in the late 1990s. The new policy was also intended to change the 'blokey' image of the magazine and to establish it as a serious sports publication rather than just another 'Lad's Mag'. However, in 2008, the November issue of Inside Sport attracted some criticism for featuring a photo of Australian swimming champion Stephanie Rice on its cover which was allegedly heavily airbrushed.

In May 2012, it was reported that sales for Inside Sport had increased by 7%, defying a current trend of declining sales for male-orientated sports & lifestyle magazines. By November 2012, sales had increased by over 27%. In March 2014, it was reported that the magazine's readership had declined by over 21% in the previous 12 months.

Roy Morgan Research indicated the magazine's readership increased by over 21% between March 2016 and March 2017. This was in contrast to the previous year (March 2015-March 2016) when readership declined by 25%.

In January 2021, online sports site Northern Beaches Sports Tribune posted an article claiming that Inside Sport had shut down. There have been no print or digital issues of Inside Sport released since June 2020. There has been no official announcement and the magazine's website continues to operate although the majority of the site's content comprises links to articles in Nextmedia's other sports-related publications such as Golf Australia & AMB and links to other sports-related websites.

References

External links

Inside Sport website
 

1991 establishments in Australia
Monthly magazines published in Australia
Sports magazines published in Australia
Magazines established in 1991